Georgios Karaiskakis is a municipality in the regional unit of Arta, Greece, named after Georgios Karaiskakis, a leader of the Greek War of Independence. The seat of the municipality is in Ano Kalentini.

Municipality
The present municipality Georgios Karaiskakis was formed at the 2011 local government reform by the merger of the following 3 former municipalities, that became municipal units:
Georgios Karaiskakis
Irakleia
Tetrafylia

The municipality has an area of 463.889 km2, the municipal unit 174.179 km2.

References

Populated places in Arta (regional unit)
Municipalities of Epirus (region)